Indian Rocks Beach, or IRB, is a city in Pinellas County, Florida, United States. The population was 4,286 at the 2018 census. Indian Rocks Beach is part of the Tampa-St. Petersburg-Clearwater, FL Metropolitan Statistical Area. Located on the barrier island Sand Key, it has over two miles of beach along the Gulf of Mexico, with 26 public beach accesses.

Geography 

Indian Rocks Beach is located at  (27.895799, –82.847550). It lies on a barrier island between the Gulf of Mexico and the Intracoastal Waterway. It is north of Indian Shores and south of Belleair Shore and Belleair Beach. Tourism is its primary industry. It was incorporated in 1956.

Demographics 

As of the census of 2000, there were 5,072 people, 2,700 households, and 1,393 families residing in the city. The racial makeup of the city was 97.18% White, 0.30% African American, 0.18% Native American, 0.61% Asian, 0.02% Pacific Islander, 0.30% from other races, and 1.42% from two or more races. Hispanic or Latino of any race were 3.17% of the population. 

There were 2,700 households, out of which 11.3% had children under the age of 18 living with them, 44.2% were married couples living together, 5.0% had a female householder with no husband present, and 48.4% were non-families. 36.7% of all households were made up of individuals, and 9.4% had someone living alone who was 65 years of age or older. The average household size was 1.88 and the average family size was 2.39. 

In the city, the population was spread out, with 10.1% under the age of 18, 4.3% from 18 to 24, 30.0% from 25 to 44, 36.9% from 45 to 64, and 18.7% who were 65 years of age or older. The median age was 48 years. For every 100 females, there were 102.8 males. For every 100 females age 18 and over, there were 102.1 males. 

The median income for a household in the city was $53,770, and the median income for a family was $65,724. Males had a median income of $41,250 versus $31,833 for females. The per capita income for the city was $40,195.  About 1.3% of families and 4.7% of the population were below the poverty line, including none of those under age 18 and 3.6% of those age 65 or over.

Locations

Food and drink 

Casa Italia – between 26th and 27th Ave

Sandy's Restaurant – between 23rd and 24th

Cafe de Paris Bakery – between 23rd and 24th Ave

Beach Waves Grill – between 23rd and 24th Ave

Guppy's on the Beach – between 17th and 18th Ave, directly across Gulf Blvd from the main IRB beach access.

Keegan's Seafood Grille – between 15th and 16th Ave

TJ's Italian Cafe – between 15th and 16th Ave

Chicago Jaqx Pizzeria and Taphouse – between 15th and 16th Ave

Red Lion Pub – between 14th and 15th Ave

Pinky's Ice Cream & Candy Shop – between 14th and 15th Ave

Groupers IRB – between 14th and 15th Ave

Salt Public House – between 13th and 14th Ave

Pajanos Pizza & Subs – between 13th and 14th Ave

Kooky Coconut – between 7th and 8th Ave

Lulu's Oyster Bar & Tap House – North side of Walsingham Road (5th Ave)

P.J.'s Oyster Bar – South side of Walsingham Road (5th Ave)

Tropical Ice Cream and Coffee – between 4th and 5th Ave

Ready Set Yo – between 4th and 5th Ave

The Original Crabby Bill's – between 4th and 5th Ave

Jimmy Guana's – between 3rd and 4th Ave (on back roads, waterfront)

Slyce Pizza Bar – between 3rd and 4th Ave

Candy Kitchen – between 3rd and 4th Ave

Los Mexicanos – between 3rd and 4th Ave

Off the Grid – between 2nd and 3rd Ave (on back street)

Aqua Prime – between 2nd and 3rd

JD's Restaurant & Lounge – between 1st St and 2nd Ave

Villa Gallace – between 1st St and 2nd Ave

Attractions 

Nekton Surf Shop is between 13th and 14th Ave. In addition to being a surf shop, you can rent paddle boards, bikes, surf boards, skim boards, and kayaks.

Indian Rocks Beach Boat Rentals is just south of the Walsingham Bridge, on the intracoastal waterway. You can rent motor boats.

Indian Rocks Beach Historical Museum is located on 4th Ave. The museum's exhibits cover local history, and it is operated by the Indian Rocks Historical Society.

Splash Harbour Water Park is a Key West themed water amusement park for children and adults, located on 4th Ave.

Island Surf Shop is a surf shop between 3rd and 4th Ave. From here, you can rent longboards, surf boards, paddleboards, and skateboards.

Beach Art Center 1515 Bay Palm Blvd, Indian Rocks Beach, FL

Parks 

Brown Park is on Bay Blvd, just north of 27th Ave, on very north end of Indian Rocks Beach. It has a playground and tennis courts.

Kolb Park is home to Campalong Baseball Field, Indian Rocks Beach Skatepark, tennis courts, basketball courts, and a large shaded playground area. This is where a lot of city events take place, such as Oktoberfest. The park is across the street from the city hall, between 15th Ave and 16th Ave.

Indian Rocks Beach Nature Preserve is located between 9th Ave and 10th Ave. The preserve features multiple boardwalk trails (some of which are waterfront), a dog park, and a community garden.

Chief Chic-A-Si Park is located on 4th Ave. It is home to the "Taste of IRB" event.

Churches 

Church of the Isles (between 24th and 25th Ave)

Calvary Episcopal Church (between 16th and 18th Ave, waterfront)

Other locations 

Mobil (26th Ave)

Beach Art Center (between 15th and 16th Ave on Bay Palms Blvd)

Indian rocks Beach Library (between 15th and 16th Ave on Bay Palms Blvd)

Indian Rocks Beach City Hall (between 15th and 16th Ave on Bay Palms Blvd)

Indian Rocks Tackle (13th Ave)

USA Grocers (13th Ave)

United States Post Office (4th Ave)

CVS (4th Ave)

Pinellas Suncoast Fire Rescue (between 3rd and 4th Ave)

Notable people 

 Sean Culkin, American football player
 Road Warrior Hawk, professional wrestler who had retired to Indian Rocks Beach
 George Scott, also a professional wrestler had retired to Indian Rocks Beach
 Turner "Tfue" Tenney, YouTuber with 11 million subscribers, Twitch streamer and a professional gamer

References

External links 

 Indian Rocks Beach official website

Cities in Pinellas County, Florida
Cities in Florida
Populated coastal places in Florida on the Gulf of Mexico
Beaches of Pinellas County, Florida
Beaches of Florida